Charles Carlisle Littlejohn was a professional baseball pitcher.

External links

Austin Kangaroos baseball players
Major League Baseball pitchers
St. Louis Cardinals players
Texarkana Twins players
Houston Buffaloes players
Rochester Red Wings players
Columbus Red Birds players
Refugio Oilers players
Baseball players from Texas
1901 births
1977 deaths